Bernard Sidney Gordon, VC, MM (16 August 1891 – 19 October 1963) was an Australian recipient of the Victoria Cross during the First World War, the highest award for gallantry in the face of the enemy that can be awarded to British and Commonwealth forces.

First World War
Gordon was 27 years old, and acting as a lance corporal in the 41st Battalion, Australian Imperial Force when, during the Battle of Amiens, the following deeds leading to him being awarded the Military Medal occurred.

This action occurred on the "Black Day" of the German Army, in which the Australian Corps destroyed their opposition. As a result of this, on 9 August 1918 the Canadian Corps advance lead to a general retreat by the German troops. The Australian 3rd Division continued to advance toward the bend in the River Somme. During this period the following action, for which Gordon was awarded the Victoria Cross, took place:

Gordon was wounded on 1 September 1918 (Bouchavesnes Spur – Battle of Mont St Quentin). He was evacuated and sent to England on 4 September 1918, where he was awarded the Military Medal on 15 September 1918. He was not awarded the Victoria Cross until 20 December 1918 (after the Armistice), the citation for which states:

Sale of his medal
Gordon's Victoria Cross was sold at auction in Sydney on 28 November 2006 for A$478,000. The medal was sold by one of Gordon's daughters, who needed money to keep the family farm in operation. The VC was purchased by an agent of media tycoon Kerry Stokes, the same man who paid a world record price of A$1 million in July 2006 for the VC awarded to Alfred Shout, A$180,000 for the George Cross of Lieutenant Commander George Gosse, and in conjunction with the South Australian Government, the VC of Major Peter Badcoe. All four medals are on display at the Australian War Memorial in Canberra.

Notes

External links
 James W. Courtney, 'Gordon, Bernard Sidney (1891–1963)', Australian Dictionary of Biography, Volume 9, Melbourne University Press, 1983, pp. 50–51

1891 births
1963 deaths
Australian Army soldiers
Australian farmers
Australian World War I recipients of the Victoria Cross
People from Launceston, Tasmania
Military personnel from Tasmania
Australian recipients of the Military Medal